The women's 100 metres event at the 2020 Summer Olympics took place on 30 and 31 July 2021 at the Japan National Stadium. 71 athletes from 55 nations competed at the event.

The defending champion, Elaine Thompson-Herah, won the event in 10.61 secs, to break Florence Griffith-Joyner's 33-year-old Olympic record. This was her third Olympic gold medal. The silver medal went to  2016 bronze medalist and the 2008 and 2012 champion in this event, Shelly-Ann Fraser-Pryce, while Shericka Jackson won the bronze medal, completing the podium sweep for Jamaica.

Summary
Early in May, two time Olympic Champion Shelly-Ann Fraser-Pryce made a categorical statement that her career is not over. Thirteen years after her first gold medal, she ran not only her personal best, but the number 2 mark of all time 10.63. She took the Jamaican Olympic Trials, while the defending Olympic Champion Elaine Thompson-Herah didn't show the same kind of form, finishing as the last qualifier in third place. At the U.S. Trials, Sha'Carri Richardson ran 10.86 potentially setting up a close race in Tokyo until Richardson was taken out of the competition after a drug test came up positive for cannabis.

The heats revealed Marie-Josée Ta Lou was ready to be in the mix, setting the African record at 10.78 to lead the round. Fraser-Pryce led the semi-final round at 10.73 over Thompson-Herah. Ta-Lou and Jamaican Trials runner-up Shericka Jackson were all under 10.80. Daryll Neita was the final qualifier at 10.992, while Michelle-Lee Ahye missed the final with 10.993.

Fraser-Pryce is known for her fast starts. In the final she was out well, but Thompson-Herah was out quickly with her. By 30 metres, Thompson-Herah took the lead, with Jackson and Ta Lou battling for bronze. From there Thompson-Herah separated from Fraser-Pryce. Jackson separated from Ta Lou and gained on Fraser-Pryce. Three metres out from the finish, Thompson-Herah held up her left arm celebrating a clear victory. Fraser-Pryce had too much of a lead for Jackson to reach her but she completed the sweep for Jamaica, the trio .15 ahead of the next competitor Ta Lou. Thompson-Herah's 10.61 was not just a clear victory, it was a .09 improvement on her personal best. It beat Florence Griffith Joyner's 1988 Olympic Record and tied Griffith Joyner's second fastest race ever while displacing Fraser-Pryce from the number 2 position on the all-time list.

Thompson-Herah joined Wyomia Tyus, Gail Devers and Fraser-Pryce as the only women to defend their 100 metres title. By winning the silver medal, Fraser-Pryce became the first person, man or woman, to win 4 Olympic medals in the blue-ribbon event of the 100m.

Background
This was the 22nd time the event was held, since the event started in 1928.

Qualification

A National Olympic Committee (NOC) could enter up to 3 qualified athletes in the women's 100 metres event if all athletes meet the entry standard or qualify by ranking during the qualifying period. (The limit of 3 has been in place since the 1930 Olympic Congress.) The qualifying standard is 11.15 seconds. This standard was "set for the sole purpose of qualifying athletes with exceptional performances unable to qualify through the IAAF World Rankings pathway." The world rankings, based on the average of the best five results for the athlete over the qualifying period and weighted by the importance of the meet, will then be used to qualify athletes until the cap of 56 is reached.

The qualifying period was originally from 1 May 2019 to 29 June 2020. Due to the COVID-19 pandemic, the period was suspended from 6 April 2020 to 30 November 2020, with the end date extended to 29 June 2021. The world rankings period start date was also changed from 1 May 2019 to 30 June 2020; athletes who had met the qualifying standard during that time were still qualified, but those using world rankings would not be able to count performances during that time. The qualifying time standards could be obtained in various meets during the given period that have the approval of the IAAF. Only outdoor meets were eligible for the sprints and short hurdles, including the 100 metres. The most recent Area Championships may be counted in the ranking, even if not during the qualifying period.

NOCs can also use their universality place—each NOC can enter one female athlete regardless of time if they had no female athletes meeting the entry standard for an athletics event—in the 100 metres.

Competition format
The event continued to use the preliminaries plus three main rounds format introduced in 2012. Athletes not meeting the qualification standard (that is, were entered through universality places) will compete in the preliminaries; those who met the standard started in the first round.

Records

Prior to this competition, the existing world and Olympic records were as follows.

The following records were established during the competition:

In the final, Elaine Thompson-Herah set the new Olympic record, improving Griffith Joyner's 1988 time by 0.01 seconds. This was the fourth oldest Olympic record in athletics.

The following national records were established during the competition:

Schedule

All times are Japan Standard Time (UTC+9)

The women's 100 metres took place over two consecutive days.

Results

Preliminaries
The preliminary round of the competition featured athletes who had not achieved the required qualifying time for the event. Athletes who had achieved that time received a bye into the first round proper.

Qualification rule: first 3 of each heat (Q) plus the fastest time (q) qualified.

Preliminary Heat 1

Preliminary Heat 2

Preliminary Heat 3

Heats
Qualification Rules: First 3 in each heat (Q) and the next 3 fastest (q) advance to the Semifinals.

Wind readings- Heat 1: -0.1 m/s; Heat 2: +0.1 m/s; Heat 3: -0.4 m/s; Heat 4: -0.3 m/s; Heat 5: +1.3 m/s; Heat 6: -0.1 m/s; Heat 7: -0.2 m/s

Heat 1

Heat 2

Heat 3

Heat 4

Heat 5

Heat 6

Heat 7

Semi-finals
Qualification Rules: First 2 in each heat (Q) and the next 2 fastest (q) advance to the final.

Wind readings- Heat 1: +0.0 m/s; Heat 2: -0.2 m/s; Heat 3: +0.3 m/s

Semifinal 1

Notes: Blessing Okagbare was prevented from competing due to an out of competition doping violation.

Semifinal 2

Semifinal 3

Final

Wind reading: -0.6 m/s

References

Women's 100 metres
2020
Women's events at the 2020 Summer Olympics
Olympics